Antoine Schneck is a French visual-art photographer born in 1963 in Suresnes, France.

He is known in particular for his portraits and still lifes with a black background. He has just finished a series of 100 artists of the French scene in their studio. He lives and works in Paris. 

A retrospective monograph of his work was published in October 2021 by InFine éditions d'art.

Education and career 
Antoine Schneck was educated in Paris where he obtained a Bachelor of Arts from the École d’Architecture Paris La Seine (DEFA) and a Master of Arts from the École nationale supérieure Louis-Lumière, a cinema, photography and sound engineering school.

Thereafter, Schneck began his career as a cameraman for a leading French TV channel. In the early 1990s he switched to photography and started to work as a free lancer for prime interior design magazines. Since 1999, Schneck has been working full-time as a French visual-art photographer, with a predilection for portraits.

Schneck is represented in Paris by the Berthet-Aittouares Gallery.

Committed to defending the copyrights of photographers, since 2018 Schneck is also a board member of France's Société des auteurs dans les arts graphiques et plastiques (ADAGP).

Works 
Very early in his career, Antoine Schneck began to embrace digital photo shooting tools, which he values for their quality and their creative potential. His work thereafter has unfolded alongside series of photographies, reflecting both his trips and his special projects. His work has always been permeated by the people he met along the way.

For his portraits with a black background, Schneck always proceeds with the same perspective and technique. Far from reflecting any form of exoticism, his objective is to approach the faces he portrays in the most direct manner. His models are asked to sit down in a translucent tent. Once steady in this neutral setting, and fully protected from any external interference, they shine before the black background while Schneck operates from outside the tent, invisible to his models.

Besides his portraits of human faces taken in villages worldwide (or on commission), his black-background photographies also include a series of celebrity dogs, commissioned by the Musée de la Chasse et de la Nature, a series on millenary olive trees, sold to private collectors, a series on World War One soldiers' uniforms, exhibited at the top of the Arc de triomphe in Paris, and a series on lying stone figures of the  Basilica of Saint-Denis, commissioned by the Centre des monuments nationaux. In recent years Schneck has also explored other techniques, and in particular wet plates collodion which he used for a series on flowers and car engines. Since 2020 Antoine has being working on a series of photographies of French artists in their studio, breaking down pictures into a reconstructed landscape and multiplying his subject throughout space.

His early works at the as an interior design photographer benefited from his sharp grasp of space, derived not only from his studies of architecture but also from his formal training as a classic dancer. His current work as a visual-art photographer owes greatly to techniques gathered through his observation of classical painting throughout history, for example that of inserting a glimpse of light in the upper right-hand side of the iris of his subjects to lighten up their stare while removing the lightning used during the shooting. The work done by Schneck on his graphic plate after a shooting is more than just retouching his photographs and has become an essential part of his work as an artist. As such it is more akin to that of painter with his model than to the work of a photographer constraints by the limits of his technique.

Personal life 
Antoine Schneck grew up in Paris. Impressed by his Jewish background and studies, Schneck is the son of Gilbert Schneck, maxillofacial surgeon, and of Hélène Pachet, dental surgeon. His father's family is from Transylvania and Galicia (Eastern Europe); his mother's family is from Lithuania and Bessarabia. Antoine Schneck is the brother Colombe Schneck, a writer, and of Marine Schneck, a graphic designer. Schneck is also the nephew Pierre Pachet, a writer, and the cousin François Pachet, a music scientist and composer, and of Yaël Pachet, a writer. He has a son, Eliot, born in 2005 from his marriage with Céline Fronval. Since 2017, he has been in a relationship with Emmanuelle Moors.

Exhibitions 
Since 2007 the work of Antoine Schneck has been regularly exhibited by the Berthet-Aittouarès Gallery and at international fairs such as Art Élysées (until 2017), Art Paris and at the BRAFA in Brussels. 
 2022
 Pixelophonie (NFT) by Antoine Schneck and Hugues Hervé, Opéra Comique, Paris.
 2021
 L'Autre, Galerie Berthet-Aittouarès, Paris.
 2020
 Le Passeur, Galerie Berthet-Aittouarès, Paris.
 2019
 Antoine Schneck dans tous ses états, Galerie Berthet-Aittouarès, Paris.
 2018
Du masque à l'âme, La Confluence, Betton.
 Du rêve à la réalité, au cœur des montagnes Miao, Couleurs de Chine, DS World, Paris.
 2017
Les beautés singulières, Galerie Berthet-Aittouarès, Paris.
 Du masque à l'âme, Le Kiosque, Vannes
 Young Master Art Prize Exhibition (4th Edition), Gallery 8, London
 Autophoto, Fondation Cartier pour l'art contemporain, Paris
 2015
Antoine Schneck, Le Carmel, Tarbes.
 Antoine Schneck, Du Burkina Faso à l’Éthiopie, et autres rencontres, Galerie Berthet-Aittouarès, Paris. 
 2014 - 2018
Soldats inconnus, Salle des Palmes, Arc de triomphe, Paris.
 2012 - 2020 (exposition permanente)
 Leur Chien, Château de Beauregard (Loir-et-Cher)
 2011	
Tsiganes en Roumanie, Fondation SAM pour l’Art Contemporain, Paris.
 L'été 2011 au Sénat, Orangerie du Sénat, Paris.
 Les Gisants, Basilica of Saint-Denis, Paris.
 2010 
Antoine Schneck, Galerie Berthet-Aittouarès, Paris. 
Leur chien, Musée de la Chasse et de la Nature, Paris
 Arts d’Afrique noire. Photographies d’Antoine Schneck, Cité de l’écrit et des métiers du livre, Montmorillon. 
 2009
Formule 1, Installation dans l’usine Ferrari, Maranello, Italie.
 Triptyque, Angers. 
 2008
Antoine Schneck, Portraits d’Afrique, Parcours des Mondes, Galerie Berthet-Aittouarès, Paris. 
Tribal Portraits, vintage and contemporary photographs from African continent, Galerie Bernard J. Shapero Rare Books, London. 
 2007
Portrait de Placido Domingo, Façade de l’Opéra de Washington, États-Unis.
 Favorites, Galerie Seine 51, Paris.
 2005
No make-up. Contemporaria, Washington. 
 2004
Une journée particulière, Galerie Beaurepaire, Paris.
 2003
Les Mariannes d’aujourd’hui, Installation sur la façade de l’Assemblée Nationale, Paris.
 2002
Tsiganes en Roumanie, Le Printemps-Haussmann, Paris. 
 2000-2001
Antoine Schneck, Photographies, Centres culturels français de Bucarest, Lasi, Timisoara (Roumanie), Kyiv (Ukraine), Chisinau (Moldavie). Exposition personnelle itinérante.
 1999
Attention Talents, Galeries Fnac de Paris, Toulouse, Nantes, Marseille.

Publications

Interviews 
 RFI, Le photographe Antoine Schneck nous livre les secrets des portraits (2017).
 France 3, Leur chien au Château de Beauregard (2012).
 Arte - Atelier A, Antoine Schneck par Frédéric Ramade (2011).

Articles 
 «Je cherche à donner accès au visage ». Antoine Schneck en quête de l’Autre par Guy Boyer, Connaissance des Arts, novembre 2021.
 Prendimi l’anima ! par Angela Ghizzi, Hestetika Vol.35, octobre 2019.
 Photo : Antoine Schneck, les yeux dans les yeux, par Beaudoin Eschapasse, Le Point, 21 octobre 2017.
 Mais qui est Antoine Schneck ? par Ba Fati, Connaissance des Arts, 4 février 2017.
 Cap sur l'Afrique - photo de couverture de Connaissance des Arts, février 2017.

Books 
 Antoine Schneck, foreword by Pierre Wat, published by InFine éditions d'art, 2021.
 Antoine Schneck, du masque à l'âme, foreword to the catalogue of the exhibit by Pierre Wat et Jérôme Clément, Editions galerie Berthet-Aittouarès, 2015.
 Les gisants de Saint-Denis, préface du catalogue de l'exposition par Pierre Pachet, Éditions du Patrimoine, 2011.
 Leur chien, foreword to the catalogue of the exhibit by Claude d’Anthenaise, curator of Musée de la Chasse et de la Nature, 2010.
 Antoine Schneck Photographies, texts by Laurent Boudier and Yaël Pachet, Éditions Galerie Berthet-Aittouarès, 2010.
 La cuisine de la Diaspora, text by Deborah Haccoun, Minerva, 2007.
 Trilogy, Burkina Faso, portrait by Antoine Schneck, Revue Soon, 2007. 
 Déco & récup, Éditions Aubanel, 2007. 
 Intérieur Parisiens vu par Dora Tauzin, Édition Gap-Japan, 2005.
 Envies de gâteaux, text by Sylvie Girard-Lagorce, Flammarion, 2003. 
 Envies de bonbons, text by Sylvie Girard-Lagorce, Flammarion, 2003. 
 Jardins de Poitiers, text by Agnès Zamboni, Patrimoine et Médias, 2001.
 Les Tsiganes, text by Hugues Moutouh, collection Dominos, Flammarion, 2000. 
 Tsiganes en Roumanie, text by Bernard Houliat, Éditions du Rouergue, 1999.

References

External links 
 
 
 

21st-century French photographers
1963 births
People from Suresnes
Living people